Strike Fighters 2: Vietnam is a Windows combat / flight simulator game based on Wings Over Vietnam set during the Vietnam War over South East Asia, and covers the time period between 1964 and 1973.

The game includes a wide variety of jets and weapons which can be employed in various mission types such as MIG-CAP (MiG combat air patrol), strike, air support, Iron Hand, and reconnaissance.
The game is based on the Strike Fighters: Project 1 engine and was developed by Third Wire Productions.

Although it can be installed as stand-alone, this title can also be installed merged with Strike Fighters 2 to provide a wider selection of stock airplanes to fly and fight against.

Gameplay 
Despite the "Lite" tag, a fair amount of realism has been built in; 1960s-style bombsights are simulated rather than modern computer-aided aiming reticules. Dive bombing and level bombing techniques have to be worked out by the game player if they are to have success at completing missions.

During a mission the players will fly in a flight of aircraft in which the computer-controlled planes keep in formation as they fly to a target. This flight can be issued commands; attack other aircraft or ground targets, fly home if they are damaged, or jettison their drop tanks. As they fly many other computer-controlled aircraft will be up in the air and can be viewed as they engage in dogfights or bomb targets.

The player can select a campaign from either Operation Rolling Thunder (1965 to 1968), Linebacker I (1972) or Linebacker II (1972) which are similar in name and aircraft involved to the actual campaigns from the conflict.

Single Missions are also available, which can be customised to allow the player to practice with specific aircraft and weapons.

External links
Developer site

References 

Combat flight simulators
Vietnam War video games
Video games set in Vietnam
2009 video games
Video games developed in the United States
Windows games
Windows-only games
Cold War video games
Third Wire Productions games